Eoin Harrap Cameron (4 January 1951 – 23 June 2016) was an Australian radio personality in Perth, Western Australia and member of the Australian House of Representatives.  Until August 2015 he presented the ABC's Perth local station 720 ABC Perth breakfast show, regularly receiving top ratings for the most popular breakfast radio show. In August 2015 he took extended leave while recovering from surgery as a result of a 2013 car accident. In January 2016 he announced that he was retiring, but would return to the studio "temporarily ... to say a proper goodbye to listeners". His last day at the ABC was 11 March.

Radio personality

Cameron started his first job in radio at age 18, at the Albany radio station 6VA in 1969. Following that he worked at many Perth radio stations including 1080 6IX, 94.5 and 6PR, as well as Melbourne station 3DB. His last 14 years, until his retirement, were as breakfast presenter for 720 ABC Perth, where he consistently topped the ratings for that time slot. He was described by colleague Geoff Hutchison as having a "delicious need to delight and offend in equal measure", and known for regularly ignoring political correctness.
 
He made minor television appearances in The Grant and Cameron show and The Entertainers, both on Channel 9.

Parliamentarian

In 1993, Cameron stood for the seat of Stirling in the federal election, winning the seat for the Liberal Party but immediately went into opposition with leader John Hewson losing the election.  He held the seat in the 1996 election that brought John Howard to power, before losing to Labor's Jann McFarlane in the 1998 election.
Cameron supported Hewson who he referred to as Huey and reckoned Hewson would win the leadership spill he initiated that he ultimately lost to Alexander Downer in 1994.

Writer

Cameron wrote a number of books including:
 Rolling into The World – Memoirs of a Ratbag Child (2003) 
 The Sixties – An Irreverent Guide (2004) 
 The Voice of the Great South (2005)

Personal life

Cameron was born in Mount Gambier, South Australia, the second of ten children. He left school at 14 and did a variety of jobs including farm labourer and roustabout. His family moved to Western Australia when he was 16.

Cameron was married, and had three children.

Cameron had bipolar disorder, which he believed to had been a cause of his sexual assault from his Headmaster at a Catholic boarding school.

In 2013 he was involved in a car crash and suffered serious back injuries, requiring multiple operations over the next two years and two metal discs to help hold his spine and support his body weight. As a result of Eoin's ongoing health battles, He was forced into an early retirement from the ABC in 2016.

On 23 June 2016, Eoin Cameron died following a heart attack in Albany, Western Australia. His death was announced on the ABC throughout the night.

References

1951 births
2016 deaths
Australian radio personalities
Liberal Party of Australia members of the Parliament of Australia
Members of the Australian House of Representatives
Members of the Australian House of Representatives for Stirling
Writers from Perth, Western Australia
People from Mount Gambier, South Australia
People with bipolar disorder
20th-century Australian politicians